Hypercallia citroclista is a moth in the family Depressariidae. It was described by Edward Meyrick in 1930. It is found in Brazil.

The wingspan is about 24 mm. The forewings are violet-ochreous brownish with a rather broad irregular pale clear yellow streak suffused into ground colour extending from the base, where it reaches the dorsum, along the costa to the apex and attenuated along the termen to below the middle, widest on the costa in the middle. There is a blackish line from the costa near the base reaching more than half across the wing. The second discal stigma forms a small transverse blackish-grey spot and there is a blackish-grey mark on the costa at two-thirds, where a hardly perceptibly darker shade of ground colour strongly sinuate outwards in the disc and then strongly inwards beneath the second discal stigma runs to a similar mark on the dorsum near the tornus, preceded on lower three-fifths by a fascia of more yellow-ochreous suffusion. The hindwings are dark grey, the apical edge pale yellow.

References

Moths described in 1930
Hypercallia